"Do You Know Where Your Man Is" is a song written by Dave Gibson, Russell Smith and Carol Chase, and recorded by American country music artist Pam Tillis. It was released in August 1993 as the fourth single from the album Homeward Looking Angel. The song reached number 16 on the Billboard Hot Country Singles & Tracks chart. Barbara Mandrell first recorded the song for her 1990 album Morning Sun. Melba Montgomery made the song the title track of her 1992 studio album on Playback Records.

Chart performance

References

1990 songs
1993 singles
Barbara Mandrell songs
Melba Montgomery songs
Pam Tillis songs
Songs written by Russell Smith (singer)
Song recordings produced by Paul Worley
Songs written by Dave Gibson (American songwriter)
Arista Nashville singles